Snug Harbor can refer to:

 Snug Harbor (jazz club)
 Sailors' Snug Harbor, former home for seamen on Staten Island
 Sailors Snug Harbor of Boston, former home for seamen in Boston
 Snug Harbour, a community in Carling, Ontario
 Snug Harbour, a former community near Norman's Bay, Newfoundland and Labrador
 Snug Harbor 18, an American sailboat design
Snug Harbor, a village within the town of South Kingstown, Rhode Island